Oleksandr Pozdeyev (born 14 June 1986) is a retired professional Ukrainian football midfielder most known for playing for Kolos Kovalivka.

Pozdeyev is a product of couple of the Kyiv city football academy Arsenal and ATEK. For short period of time in 2010-2012 he fell out of traceable football competition after FC Veres Rivne went bankrupt back in 2009. Pozdeyev became noticeable sometime later after 2012 joining FC Kolos Kovalivka when during the 2016-17 Ukrainian First League season he scored 10 goals.

References

External links
 
 
 

1986 births
Living people
Ukrainian footballers
Ukrainian expatriate footballers
Ukrainian Premier League players
Ukrainian First League players
Ukrainian Second League players
FC Arsenal-2 Kyiv players
FC Zirka Kropyvnytskyi players
FC Yednist Plysky players
FC Nafkom Brovary players
FC CSKA Kyiv players
NK Veres Rivne players
FC Kolos Kovalivka players
FC Prykarpattia Ivano-Frankivsk (2004) players
FC AGMK players
Association football midfielders
Expatriate footballers in Uzbekistan
Ukrainian expatriate sportspeople in Uzbekistan